In literature, an author uses contrast when they describe the difference(s) between two or more entities. According to the Oxford Dictionary, contrast is comparing two things in order to show the differences between them. It is common in many works of Literature. For example, in The Pearl by John Steinbeck, a clear contrast is drawn between the Lower Class and the Upper Class residents of the society presented in the text. The Lower Class citizens live in brush houses, their economic activity is fishing and are sociable. These ones are represented by Kino, the main character and the fishermen. On the other hand, the Upper Class citizens live in plastered buildings, they engage in reputable economic activities such as medicine and are more focused to their economic activities as opposed to social interactions. 

In addition, in the first four lines of William Shakespeare's Sonnet 130, Shakespeare contrasts a mistress to the sun, coral, snow, and wire.

Contrast is the antonym of simile. In poetic compositions, it is common for poets to set out an elaborate contrast or elaborate simile as the argument. For example, John Donne and the metaphysical poets developed the conceit as a literary device, where an elaborate, implausible, and surprising analogy was demonstrated. In Renaissance poetry, and particularly in sonnets, the contrast was similarly used as a poetic argument. In such verse, the entire poem argues that two seemingly alike or identical items are, in fact, quite separate and paradoxically different. These may take the form of my love is unlike all other women or I am unlike her other loves.

In the early 18th century, a theory of wit developed by English writers (particularly John Locke) held that judgement sees the differences in like things, or imagination or fancy sees the likeness in different things, and wit operates properly by employing judgement and fancy to form sound propositions. In lyric poetry, the author is often attempting to show how what seems to be solely an exercise of judgement or fancy is, in fact, wit.

References 
1. Oxford, (2010), Oxford Advanced Learner's Dictionary of Current English, International Student's Edition (8th Edition) Oxford University Press, United Kingdom 
2. Steinbeck J. (2000), The Pearl, Longman, England
Narratology
Rhetoric